Archie's Weird Mysteries (French: Archie, mystères et compagnie) is an animated television series based on the characters by Archie Comics. The series premise revolves around a Riverdale High physics lab gone awry, making the town of Riverdale a "magnet" for B movie-style monsters. All the main characters solve strange mysteries in a format similar to both Scooby-Doo and The X-Files.

Produced by Les Studios Tex and DIC Productions, L.P., the series was initially shown mornings on the PAX network, often with infomercials bookending the program. The series eventually premiered in France on M6 on 19 January 2000.

Voice cast and characters

Main
 Andrew Rannells as Archie Andrews, a redheaded, freckled student at Riverdale High, and the show's titular character. Handsome, loving, fun, and good-hearted, he is a reporter for the school newspaper. All of his news stories are centered around the surreal occurrences that take place within each episode, and they always end with "in a little town called Riverdale…". Despite his nerdy, slightly clumsy demeanor, he frequently attracts girls, human or otherwise.
 America Young as Betty Cooper, a girl-next-door who is intelligent, beautiful, cute, level-headed, caring, and the head of the cheerleading squad. She is in love with Archie and is best friends with Veronica, despite them both competing for Archie's affection. She has bright blonde hair that's always worn in a ponytail.
 Camille Schmidt as Veronica Lodge, a beautiful, rich, popular, and somewhat self-centered girl. She is best friends with Betty, with whom she also shares a rivalry for Archie's affection. Although both of them are frequently the target of Reggie's advances, Veronica is targeted somewhat more often. Her hair appears black, but in the show, she is described as a brunette.
 Chris Lundquist as Jughead Jones, a funny, quirky, and geeky guy who loves food (especially hamburgers) and is Archie's best friend. He does not like girls except for Betty, and he and Veronica are usually at each other's throats. Jughead usually wears a gray whoopee cap on his head, covering his choppy black hair.
 Paul Sosso as Reggie Mantle, a self-confident, popular, rich jock who has a crush on Veronica (which she does not reciprocate) and is frenemies with Archie. Like most other protagonists of the show, he has black hair. In this particular incarnation, he has a niece named Amy. He and Dilton are the only main protagonists in the show who don't always appear in every episode or don't get mentioned in every episode.
 Ben Beck as Dilton Doiley, a bespectacled, nerdy genius who is friends with Archie, Jughead, Moose, and Betty. He usually helps the gang save the day. He and Reggie are the only protagonists who do not always make an appearance or mention. His catchphrase is, "I'll be super amalgamated!"

Supporting
 Tony Wike as Mr. Waldo Weatherbee, the Principal of Riverdale High, a bald man who has it in for Archie the most as he blames him for most of the weird events happening at school.
 Jerry Longe as Moose Mason, a high school jock who is a friend of Archie, Jughead, Dilton, and Betty. He is the boyfriend of Midge Klump.
 Lucinda, a Southern woman who practices voodoo magic, provides advice regarding the supernatural, and creates potions for individuals in love. She is considered to be a charmer.
 Ryle Smith as Pop Tate, the owner and operator of the "Pop Tate Chock'lit Shoppe" shop where Archie and his friends hang out. He calls Jughead his best customer.
 Mr. Fisk - the CEO of ZoomCo who, after discovering that his Zoom energy drink contains a mutant formula that causes some people to mutate into monsters, tries to bribe and stop Archie from telling the world on national TV. He convinces Archie not to tell the news, as doing so would destroy his company and many people's jobs.
 Jerry Longe as Dr. Beaumont, a man who is the caretaker and owner of an odds/supernatural/curiosity store. He provides advice to Archie and friends as he solves weird mysteries.
 Jerry Longe as Smithers, Veronica's cynical butler. He is aware of the supernatural, but is only interested in serving Veronica.
 John Michael Lee as Mr. Hiram Lodge, Veronica's father who is disapproving of Archie.
 Miss Grundy is the homeroom teacher of Archie, Veronica, Betty, Jughead, and Reggie. She has feelings for Mr. Weatherbee. Her first name is Geraldine in the original comics, but her first name is Doris in the show.

Other students of Riverdale High School
 Michele Phillips as Ethel Muggs – a nerdy girl who has a crush on Jughead. She is usually ignored by most of her peers. She is into magic, and she is also a beekeeper.
 Jill Anderson as Midge Klump – Moose's girlfriend, in spite of their differences in intelligence. She is Reggie's love interest, although she does not like him very much. She is into athletics and wants to become a stuntwoman.
 Vinny Wells (or Vinnie Wells) – a teenage delinquent who only appeared in the three episodes "Archie's Date with Fate", "Alternate Riverdales" and "Teen Out of Time", where he and his future self were the main antagonists. He first appeared in "Archie's Date with Fate", when he was said to be breaking into the other students' lockers for money to buy nachos.
 Olga Karpuchi is the civilian identity of a superheroine, named Supreme Girl. Her enemy is Dr. Arachnid, who is a supervillain from a place called "The Twelfth Dimension". She is a student and a fellow newspaper reporter, who works with Archie on newspaper columns for the school. She has a crush on Archie. Olga is an exclusive character to the show.
 Robbie Dopkins – also an Archie's Weird Mysteries-exclusive character. He was shown in the episode "Invisible Archie", where he gets the romantic attention of both Betty and Veronica for developing large muscles. He was said to be the reason that Reggie was kicked from the track-and-field team.

Episodes

Selected monsters, ghosts, and other supernatural characters
 a sea monster, who lives in an old Riverdale swimming hole
 a mummy in a museum exhibit
 werewolf sheriff
 mad scientists
 a 50-foot Veronica
 vampires
 giant beetle
 UFOs
 zombies
 "Stanley 9000" (an artificially intelligent talking processor)
 mutant crocodile
 man-eating worm
 super smart rats
 super smart teen (in "Brain of Terror")
 giant cockroaches
 Tapioca Pudding Glob
 alien potatoes
 insane artificial intelligence in Archie's car alarm, also in Archie's Car Named Betsy.
 ancient wish-granting artifacts gone haywire
 Ghost of Quiet Violet - she used to be a very strict librarian when Jughead was young. She completely scared Jughead away so much when he was young that he stopped going to the library. As a ghost, she haunts the library.
 monster "Archie" – Archie gets turned into a monster when he drinks a new energy drink called "Zoom".
 monster "Stevenson" – Stevenson, a health and workout advocate, gets turned into a monster when he drinks a new energy drink called "Zoom".
 genie - escapes from an urn in Dr. Beaumont's store into Archie's laptop. Reggie, in turn, uses the laptop and is granted three wishes; after which, the Genie is set free and begins to wreak havoc on the city.
 Reggie Droid - after Reggie points out to two aliens who've abducted him that his friends will know he's missing, the aliens make a droid clone to cover up Reggie's absence, but to ensure his friends find him, Reggie lies about his personality traits, thus creating a nice version of himself. In case of discovery and revealing his creators to other Earthlings, the droid has a nuclear bomb inside him.
 Evil Trogs' Leader and his Trogs in "Virtually Evil"
 Mega-Mall of Horrors. 
 Maria Nacht - she haunted Archie, Betty, Veronica, and Jughead in their dreams
 Arnie - haunted Big Ethel in her dreams.
 Evil Sentient Humanoid-Like Talking Bees.

Broadcast

United States
The series first ran in the United States on PAX, and was the first newly produced animated feature to first air on the network. It was planned to air alongside fellow DIC program Sherlock Holmes in the 22nd Century as part of an hour-long block, but the latter show instead aired on Fox Kids, leaving Archie to air alongside other DIC shows on the channel's PAX Kids strand. It later moved to a daily-slot on the network and remained on PAX until late 2000.

In 2001, the show began to air on syndicated television stations throughout the United States, as a way to comply with their mandatory E/I regulations. The series would later be part of the syndicated DIC Kids Network block beginning in 2003, also to comply with E/I regulations.

From 2012 to 2018, the show reran on Qubo.

The full series has recently become available on Paramount+.

France
Archie, Mystère Et Compagnie first ran on M6 on 19 January 2000 as part of the channel's M6 Kid strand, and later reran on Disney Channel and Toon Disney in the country.

Production notes
The theme song was written and performed by Mike Piccirillo. Musical underscore composers were Mike Piccirillo and Jean-Michel Guirao. The Riverdale vampires story arc episodes were put together and released on VHS as Archie and the Riverdale Vampires. The voice cast was provided by the Omaha Theater Company for Young People of Omaha, Nebraska.

Comics
An ashcan comic book tie-in also titled Archie's Weird Mysteries, written by Paul Castiglia, pencilled by Bill Golliher, inked by Rick Koslowski and colored by Stephanie Coronado (née Vozzo) was published in 1999. This led to a February 2000 launch for an ongoing, regular-sized series with the same name and creative team. The first issue notably serves as an origin story for the canon's premise, showcasing the implied lab incident that turned Riverdale into a supernatural magnet, and the moment when Archie decided to start his Weird Mystery column.

"Weird" was dropped from the title starting with #25, signaling the end of the tie-in with the television series, and the comics were canceled at #34 after ten issues of doing straight mystery stories with no supernatural or science-fiction components.

Home media releases

United States
On 30 August 2000 Universal Studios Home Video released a VHS tape titled Archie and the Riverdale Vampires, which featured the episode "Attack of the Killer Spuds" alongside the Riverdale Vampires trilogy, with the latter three episodes being shortened, edited and merged to form one continuous feature. The beginning also featured some exclusive narration from Archie Andrews about how Riverdale ended up how it was. The same episodes were also featured in the Monster Bash Fun Pack, although those are just the standard TV-length episodes.

United Kingdom

Australia
All the Australian DVDs were released by MRA Entertainment.

The Archies in Jugman
In 2002, DIC produced a TV movie as part of their DIC Movie Toons series, titled The Archies in Jugman. It originally premiered on television on Nickelodeon on 3 November and was released on DVD and VHS shortly afterward by MGM Home Entertainment, followed on with international airings on Disney Channel and Toon Disney. The movie features the same character designs (but with different outfits and new looks) as this series, as well as most of the same crew and voice cast, and the similar theme of weird events happening in Riverdale.

Notes

References

External links
 Archie's Weird Mysteries at DHX Media
 

 
 Official Archie Comics website

1999 American television series debuts
2000 American television series endings
1990s American animated television series
1990s American high school television series
1990s American horror television series
1990s American mystery television series
2000s American animated television series
2000s American high school television series
2000s American horror television series
2000s American mystery television series
1999 French television series debuts
2000 French television series endings
1990s French animated television series
2000s French animated television series
American children's animated horror television series
American children's animated mystery television series
American children's animated science fiction television series
American animated television spin-offs
French children's animated horror television series
French children's animated mystery television series
French children's animated science fiction television series
French animated television spin-offs
English-language television shows
French-language television shows
PAX TV original programming
Animated television series about monsters
Teen animated television series
Television series by DIC Entertainment
Television shows based on Archie Comics
Television series created by Jymn Magon